Sir Henry Angest (born July 1940) is a Swiss-born London-based banker and political donor. He is the chairman and formerly chief executive officer of Arbuthnot Latham, a merchant bank in the City of London.

Early life
Henry Angest was born in July 1940 in Switzerland.

Career
Angest serves as the chairman and CEO of Arbuthnot Latham, a private bank in the City of London. Arbuthnot Latham owns 20% of Secure Trust Bank, which owns Everyday Loan.

Angest served on the board of directors of the Parity Group from 1997 to 2002. He has served as Master of the Worshipful Company of International Bankers.

Political activity
Angest has made large donations to the Conservative Party, where he has served as treasurer. He has also donated to William Hague, Chris Grayling, and Murdo Fraser. He has been invited to private dinners with British Prime Minister David Cameron at 10 Downing Street and Chequers.

He has made donations to The Atlantic Bridge, The Freedom Association, and Global Britain, an anti-European Union think tank.

In 2015, he was knighted in Queen's Birthday Honours List "for political services". As a result, if he were to become a British Subject then he would be styled Sir Henry Angest.

Personal life
He is married to Dorothy Angest. In 2010, he was worth an estimated £45 million.

References

Living people
Bankers from London
Swiss emigrants to the United Kingdom
Swiss bankers
Conservative Party (UK) people
Knights Bachelor
1940 births